GDD may mean:

Game design document, a design document specific to video games.
Gaseous detection device, a technology used with some electron microscopes and similar instruments
Geographically Distributed Development
Glaucoma drainage device
Global Data Dictionary
Global Drug Development
Global developmental delay, a childhood medical disorder
Goal-Directed Design, a user interface design method developed by Alan Cooper
Group delay dispersion (Group velocity dispersion), effect of a medium on an optical signal
Google Developer Day, Google promotional events for developers
Great Dragon's Dale, a Russian-language video gaming magazine
Green Degree Directory
Growing degree-day, a unit for measuring climatic warmth over a period of time